Denby Dale Viaduct is a grade II listed railway viaduct in Denby Dale, West Yorkshire, England. The curving viaduct carries the Penistone line over the Dearne valley in Denby Dale. The viaduct is constructed of stone, but the first viaduct to carry the line in that location was made of wood, being replaced by the current structure in 1880. The abutments of the former viaduct are easily discernible against the western side of the present viaduct.

History 
Originally, all viaducts on the line were supposed to be constructed of stone, and whilst some were, such as Lockwood Viaduct further north, others such as Denby Dale were hastily designed and constructed from wood due to a stone-masons strike, which had inflated the price of building a viaduct in this material due to the shortage of skilled labour. However, this first viaduct collapsed during a gale in January 1847, with a local newspaper reporting that "27 out of the 50 perpendicular supports were blown down [and] such was the distance that they had to fall, the strongest timbers were broken into splinters and matchwood." A replacement timber viaduct was erected on the site between 1848 and 1849, with the railway opening to traffic in 1850. 

Robert Stephenson inspected the wooden bridges and viaducts on the line in 1851, and declared them safe (stating that had had an "entire conviction of their perfect safety.."), however, Denby Dale Viaduct was reported as being unsafe by 1869, and a replacement viaduct was not constructed until 13 years later. Improvements and repairs were undertaken after the 1869 report, and in 1874, an appointed inspector tested the viaduct by running four engines coupled together (each weighing ) across it, and checking for vibrations. The inspector's report detailed that 

The timber viaduct was taken down in 1884, four years after the stone replacement viaduct opened. The architect and engineer for both viaducts was John Hawkshaw, who by the time of the 1880 viaduct, was acting as a consulting engineer. The decision to switch from stone to timber in the 1840s was a last minute one, which, according to Hawkshaw's obituary paid off well, as it prevented a delay in the line's completion. The revenue earned from the outset, and the lack of compensatory tariffs paid out for a delayed line, meant that the new stone viaduct could be paid for from these receipts. However, some criticism was levelled at the company (the L&YR) in that the new viaduct was built over an old coal mine, and a letter from the town clerk of Denby Dale stated that some of the old workings had been filled up, but not all. The stone abutments of the original trestle viaduct can be seen from the present viaduct, just west of each end.

The contractors for building the viaduct were a local firm, Naylors, who tendered a cost of £27,650, and estimated a time of two and half years. The viaduct was finished early, but at a significant loss to the contractors.

See also 
Listed buildings in Denby Dale
Lockwood Viaduct, another viaduct on the same line

Notes

References

Sources

External links 

Mapping from 1903 - use the slider on the bottom left to toggle with modern day satellite imagery. The old abutments of the timber viaduct are clearly discernible
Image of both viaducts together, with the timber viaduct being dismantled

Grade II listed buildings in West Yorkshire
Railway viaducts in West Yorkshire
Bridges completed in 1880
Viaduct